Lisa Durden is a media commentator and producer. Durden was born and raised in Newark, New Jersey and graduated from Seton Hall University with a degree in journalism. She has provided commentary on The Kelly File and other television programs on subjects including racism, Black Lives Matter, and celebrity culture.

Durden hosted a talk show, The Lisa Durden Show, that aired on Newark and Manhattan public access cable channels. She was the associate producer for the documentary Brick City, and producer of the documentary Soul Food Junkies, which won the 2012 Grand Jury Prize of Best Documentary at the American Black Film Festival.

On June 6, 2017, Durden appeared on Fox News in an interview with Tucker Carlson, discussing a Black Lives Matter chapter that held a Memorial Day event exclusively for black people. Durden defended the chapter's actions, saying "Boo-hoo-hoo... You white people are angry because you couldn’t use your ‘white privilege’ card to get invited to the Black Lives Matter’s all-black Memorial Day celebration." Carlson responded by calling Durden "hostile and separatist and crazy" and "demented". Two days later, Durden was suspended from her position of adjunct professor at Essex County College in Newark. Two weeks later, she was fired. Durden described the experience as being "publicly lynched". College president Anthony Munroe said the firing was in response to concerns and fears expressed by students, faculty, and prospective students following Durden's remarks on television.

A legal analysis by the campus free speech organization Foundation for Individual Rights in Education (FIRE) said that the firing violated established First Amendment law for public employees, and rejected Munroe's claim that Durden's remarks made it impossible for her to do her job. FIRE stated that "if simply offending others and causing an 'outpouring' of criticism and consternation were sufficient to overcome a faculty member's First Amendment rights, freedom of expression on campus would be reduced to a nullity."

On July 25, 2017, Durden announced she would be running for New Jersey Lieutenant Governor on the Green Party ticket alongside Seth Kaper-Dale. They lost, having received only 0.47% of the votes.

References

External links

 

Living people
21st-century American journalists
African-American women journalists
African-American journalists
American political commentators
American women television producers
People from Newark, New Jersey
Seton Hall University alumni
Film producers from New Jersey
African-American film producers
1960s births
American women film producers
21st-century American women
21st-century African-American women
21st-century African-American people
20th-century African-American people
20th-century African-American women
Television producers from New Jersey